Weijland is a village in the Dutch province of South Holland. It is a part of the municipality of Bodegraven, and lies about 5 km west of Woerden.

The statistical area "Weijland", which also can include the surrounding countryside, has a population of around 400.

References

Populated places in South Holland